The European long-distance paths (E-paths) are a network of long-distance footpaths that traverse Europe. While most long-distance footpaths in Europe are located in just one country or region, each of these numbered European long-distance paths passes through many different countries.

The first long-distance hiking trail in Europe was the National Blue Trail of Hungary, established in 1938. The formation of the European Union made transnational hiking trails possible. In general the routes connect and make use of existing national and local trails such as the GR footpaths.

The paths are officially designated by the European Ramblers' Association.

List

See also
Geography of Europe
GR footpath
EuroVelo, the European cycle route network
Long-distance trails in the United States

References

External links

Overview of the paths (European Ramblers' Association)
Find all hiking trails (Waymarkedtrails.org)
Find the OpenStreetMap Project on E-paths (Openstreetmap.org)
Transcaucasian Trail (Transcaucasian Trail)

 
01
Europe